Chickcharnea is a monotypic genus in the family Buccinidae, the true whelks, containing one species of sea snail, a marine gastropod mollusk, Chickcharnea fragilis.

References 

Buccinoidea (unassigned)
Gastropods described in 2002